Cindy Oak (born April 21, 1961) is an American former alpine skier.

Primarily noted as a downhill skier, Oak had 5 top ten World Cup finishes between 1980 and 1985 including a tenth-place finish in the World Championship in 1982.

Oak lives in Ellicottville, NY with her husband and three children and is a member of Holimont.

References

External links
 fis-ski.com

1961 births
Living people
American female alpine skiers
Place of birth missing (living people)
21st-century American women